Regional elections were held on 1 September 2022, with a second round on 15 September 2022, to elect the 37 members of the newly-formed Regional Council of Nouakchott, created after the 2017 Mauritanian constitutional referendum in replacement of the Senate and the Urban Community of Nouakchott.

Ex-mayor of Tevragh-Zeina Fatimetou Mint Abdel Malick, running for the ruling party Union for the Republic won a narrow majority on the second round against Mohamed Jamil Ould Mansour, the opposition-backed candidate and previous leader of the Islamist Tewassoul party.

Background
Mint Abdel Malick was first presented as candidate of the Union for the Republic on 8 July 2018 together with the rest of candidates to head the regional councils of the country.

Election system
Regional councils in Mauritania are elected using the proportional representation system of the largest remainder method with two rounds. In the first round, voters choose from one of several lists running. If one list obtains an absolute majority of votes, the council seats would be then distributed proportionally. If not, a second round must be held between the two largest lists. The president of the Regional Council is elected by the Regional Council from one of their members.

Results

Members
Below is a list of members elected to the first Regional Council of Nouakchott and the party/coalition they were elected with.

See also
 2018 Mauritanian parliamentary election
 2018 Mauritanian regional elections

References

Noukachott
Noukachott
Elections in Mauritania